Guaguasi is a 1983 Dominican war comedy-drama film directed by Jorge Ulla. The film was selected as the Dominican entry for the Best Foreign Language Film at the 56th Academy Awards, but was not accepted as a nominee.

Cast
 Orestes Matacena as Guaguasi
 Marilyn Pupo as Marina
 Raimundo Hidalgo-Gato as Moya
 Marco Santiago as Raul
 Rolando Barral as Cmndt. Jorge Montiel
 Clara Hernandez as Isabel
 Jose Bahamonde as Flor
 Oswaldo Calvo as Col. Acosta
 Mercedes Enriquez as Elisa

See also
 List of submissions to the 56th Academy Awards for Best Foreign Language Film
 List of Dominican submissions for the Academy Award for Best Foreign Language Film

References

External links
 

1983 films
1983 comedy films
1983 drama films
1983 comedy-drama films
1980s war comedy-drama films
Dominican Republic war comedy-drama films
1980s Spanish-language films